Glenoleon meteoricus is a species of antlion that occurs in Australia.

References 

Myrmeleontidae
Insects of Australia
Insects described in 1885